Actinote thalia is a butterfly of the family Nymphalidae. It was described by Carl Linnaeus in the 1758 10th edition of Systema Naturae. It is found in most of South America. An attempt was made by the South African programme to defoliate the Chromolaena odorata, a shrub of Neotropical origin, by this species, but was disqualified due to an unacceptably wide host range.

The larvae feed on Mikania species, Eupatorium odoratum and Chromolaena odoratum.

Subspecies
A. t. thalia (Suriname, Venezuela)
A. t. anteas (Doubleday, [1847]) (Mexico, Costa Rica, Honduras, Guatemala, Panama, Venezuela, Colombia)
A. t. brettia Oberthür, 1917 (Colombia)
A. t. byssa Oberthür, 1917 (Venezuela)
A. t. cedestis Jordan, 1913 (Ecuador)
A. t. crassinia (Hopffer, 1874) (Peru, Bolivia)
A. t. eupelia Jordan, 1913 (Bolivia, Argentina)
A. t. suspecta Jordan, 1913 (Ecuador)
A. t. terpsinoe (C. & R. Felder, 1862) (Peru, Bolivia)

References

 Actinote thalia at Insecta.pro

Butterflies described in 1758
Acraeini
Nymphalidae of South America
Taxa named by Carl Linnaeus